In geometry, various formalisms exist to express a rotation in three dimensions as a mathematical transformation. In physics, this concept is applied to classical mechanics where rotational (or angular) kinematics is the science of quantitative description of a purely rotational motion. The orientation of an object at a given instant is described with the same tools, as it is defined as an imaginary rotation from a reference placement in space, rather than an actually observed rotation from a previous placement in space.

According to Euler's rotation theorem the rotation of a rigid body (or three-dimensional coordinate system with the fixed origin) is described by a single rotation about some axis. Such a rotation may be uniquely described by a minimum of three real parameters. However, for various reasons, there are several ways to represent it. Many of these representations use more than the necessary minimum of three parameters, although each of them still has only three degrees of freedom.

An example where rotation representation is used is in computer vision, where an automated observer needs to track a target. Consider a rigid body, with three orthogonal unit vectors fixed to its body (representing the three axes of the object's local coordinate system). The basic problem is to specify the orientation of these three unit vectors, and hence the rigid body, with respect to the observer's coordinate system, regarded as a reference placement in space.

Rotations and motions

Rotation formalisms are focused on proper (orientation-preserving) motions of the Euclidean space with one fixed point, that a rotation refers to. Although physical motions with a fixed point are an important case (such as ones described in the center-of-mass frame, or motions of a joint), this approach creates a knowledge about all motions. Any proper motion of the Euclidean space decomposes to a rotation around the origin and a translation. Whichever the order of their composition will be, the "pure" rotation component wouldn't change, uniquely determined by the complete motion.

One can also understand "pure" rotations as linear maps in a vector space equipped with Euclidean structure, not as maps of points of a corresponding affine space. In other words, a rotation formalism captures only the rotational part of a motion, that contains three degrees of freedom, and ignores the translational part, that contains another three.

When representing a rotation as numbers in a computer, some people prefer the quaternion representation or the axis+angle representation, because they avoid the gimbal lock that can occur with Euler rotations.

Formalism alternatives

Rotation matrix

The above-mentioned triad of unit vectors is also called a basis. Specifying the coordinates (components) of vectors of this basis in its current (rotated) position, in terms of the reference (non-rotated) coordinate axes, will completely describe the rotation.

These parameters can be written as the elements of a  matrix , called a rotation matrix. Typically, the coordinates of each of these vectors are arranged along a column of the matrix (however, beware that an alternative definition of rotation matrix exists and is widely used, where the vectors' coordinates defined above are arranged by rows)

The elements of the rotation matrix are not all independent—as Euler's rotation theorem dictates, the rotation matrix has only three degrees of freedom.

The rotation matrix has the following properties:
  is a real, orthogonal matrix, hence each of its rows or columns represents a unit vector.

The angle  which appears in the eigenvalue expression corresponds to the angle of the Euler axis and angle representation. The eigenvector corresponding to the eigenvalue of 1 is the accompanying Euler axis, since the axis is the only (nonzero) vector which remains unchanged by left-multiplying (rotating) it with the rotation matrix.

The above properties are equivalent to

which is another way of stating that  form a 3D orthonormal basis. These statements comprise a total of 6 conditions (the cross product contains 3), leaving the rotation matrix with just 3 degrees of freedom, as required.

 
(Note the order, since the vector being rotated is multiplied from the right).

The ease by which vectors can be rotated using a rotation matrix, as well as the ease of combining successive rotations, make the rotation matrix a useful and popular way to represent rotations, even though it is less concise than other representations.

Euler axis and angle (rotation vector)

From Euler's rotation theorem we know that any rotation can be expressed as a single rotation about some axis. The axis is the unit vector (unique except for sign) which remains unchanged by the rotation. The magnitude of the angle is also unique, with its sign being determined by the sign of the rotation axis.

The axis can be represented as a three-dimensional unit vector

and the angle by a scalar .

Since the axis is normalized, it has only two degrees of freedom. The angle adds the third degree of freedom to this rotation representation.

The rotation vector is useful in some contexts, as it represents a three-dimensional rotation with only three scalar values (its components), representing the three degrees of freedom. This is also true for representations based on sequences of three Euler angles (see below).

If the rotation angle  is zero, the axis is not uniquely defined. Combining two successive rotations, each represented by an Euler axis and angle, is not straightforward, and in fact does not satisfy the law of vector addition, which shows that finite rotations are not really vectors at all. It is best to employ the rotation matrix or quaternion notation, calculate the product, and then convert back to Euler axis and angle.

Euler rotations

The idea behind Euler rotations is to split the complete rotation of the coordinate system into three simpler constitutive rotations, called precession, nutation, and intrinsic rotation, being each one of them an increment on one of the Euler angles. Notice that the outer matrix will represent a rotation around one of the axes of the reference frame, and the inner matrix represents a rotation around one of the moving frame axes. The middle matrix represents a rotation around an intermediate axis called line of nodes.

However, the definition of Euler angles is not unique and in the literature many different conventions are used. These conventions depend on the axes about which the rotations are carried out, and their sequence (since rotations are not commutative).

The convention being used is usually indicated by specifying the axes about which the consecutive rotations (before being composed) take place, referring to them by index  or letter . The engineering and robotics communities typically use 3-1-3 Euler angles. Notice that after composing the independent rotations, they do not rotate about their axis anymore. The most external matrix rotates the other two, leaving the second rotation matrix over the line of nodes, and the third one in a frame comoving with the body. There are  possible combinations of three basic rotations but only  of them can be used for representing arbitrary 3D rotations as Euler angles. These 12 combinations avoid consecutive rotations around the same axis (such as XXY) which would reduce the degrees of freedom that can be represented.

Therefore, Euler angles are never expressed in terms of the external frame, or in terms of the co-moving rotated body frame, but in a mixture. Other conventions (e.g., rotation matrix or quaternions) are used to avoid this problem.

In aviation orientation of the aircraft is usually expressed as intrinsic Tait-Bryan angles following the  convention, which are called heading, elevation, and bank (or synonymously, yaw, pitch, and roll).

Quaternions

Quaternions, which form a four-dimensional vector space, have proven very useful in representing rotations due to several advantages over the other representations mentioned in this article.

A quaternion representation of rotation is written as a versor (normalized quaternion):

The above definition stores the quaternion as an array following the convention used in (Wertz 1980) and (Markley 2003). An alternative definition, used for example in (Coutsias 1999) and (Schmidt 2001), defines the "scalar" term as the first quaternion element, with the other elements shifted down one position.

In terms of the Euler axis 

and angle  this versor's components are expressed as follows: 

Inspection shows that the quaternion parametrization obeys the following constraint:

The last term (in our definition) is often called the scalar term, which has its origin in quaternions when understood as the mathematical extension of the complex numbers, written as 

and where  are the hypercomplex numbers satisfying

Quaternion multiplication, which is used to specify a composite rotation, is performed in the same manner as multiplication of complex numbers, except that the order of the elements must be taken into account, since multiplication is not commutative. In matrix notation we can write quaternion multiplication as

Combining two consecutive quaternion rotations is therefore just as simple as using the rotation matrix.

we can represent this with quaternion parameters in a similarly concise way:

Quaternions are a very popular parametrization due to the following properties:
More compact than the matrix representation and less susceptible to round-off errors
Expression of the rotation matrix in terms of quaternion parameters involves no trigonometric functions
It is simple to combine two individual rotations represented as quaternions using a quaternion product

Like rotation matrices, quaternions must sometimes be renormalized due to rounding errors, to make sure that they correspond to valid rotations. The computational cost of renormalizing a quaternion, however, is much less than for normalizing a  matrix.

Quaternions also capture the spinorial character of rotations in three dimensions. For a three-dimensional object connected to its (fixed) surroundings by slack strings or bands, the strings or bands can be untangled after two complete turns about some fixed axis from an initial untangled state. Algebraically, the quaternion describing such a rotation changes from a scalar +1 (initially), through (scalar + pseudovector) values to scalar −1 (at one full turn), through (scalar + pseudovector) values back to scalar +1 (at two full turns). This cycle repeats every 2 turns. After  turns (integer ), without any intermediate untangling attempts, the strings/bands can be partially untangled back to the  turns state with each application of the same procedure used in untangling from 2 turns to 0 turns. Applying the same procedure  times will take a -tangled object back to the untangled or 0 turn state. The untangling process also removes any rotation-generated twisting about the strings/bands themselves. Simple 3D mechanical models can be used to demonstrate these facts.

Rodrigues vector 

The Rodrigues vector (sometimes called the Gibbs vector, with coordinates called Rodrigues parameters) can be expressed in terms of the axis and angle of the rotation as follows:

This representation is a higher-dimensional analog of the gnomonic projection, mapping unit quaternions from a 3-sphere onto the 3-dimensional pure-vector hyperplane.

It has a discontinuity at 180° ( radians): as any rotation vector  tends to an angle of  radians, its tangent tends to infinity.

A rotation  followed by a rotation  in the Rodrigues representation has the simple rotation composition form

Today, the most straightforward way to prove this formula is in the (faithful) doublet representation, where , etc.

The combinatoric features of the Pauli matrix derivation just mentioned are also identical to the equivalent  quaternion derivation below.  Construct a quaternion associated with a spatial rotation R as,

Then the composition of the rotation RB with RA is the rotation RC=RBRA, with rotation axis and angle defined by the product of the quaternions,

that is

Expand this quaternion product to  

Divide both sides of this equation by the identity resulting from the previous one,

and evaluate

This is Rodrigues' formula for the axis of a composite rotation defined in terms of the axes of the two component rotations.  He derived this formula in 1840 (see page 408).   The three rotation axes A, B, and C form a spherical triangle and the dihedral angles between the planes formed by the sides of this triangle are defined by the rotation angles.

Modified Rodrigues parameters (MRPs) can be expressed in terms of Euler axis and angle by

Its components can be expressed in terms of the components of a unit quaternion representing the same rotation as

The modified Rodrigues vector is a stereographic projection mapping unit quaternions from a 3-sphere onto the 3-dimensional pure-vector hyperplane. The projection of the opposite quaternion -q results in a different modified Rodrigues vector  than the projection of the original quaternion q.  Comparing components one obtains that

Notably, if one of these vectors lies inside the unit 3-sphere, the other will lie outside.

Cayley–Klein parameters

See definition at Wolfram Mathworld.

Higher-dimensional analogues

Vector transformation law 
Active rotations of a 3D vector p in Euclidean space around an axis n over an angle η can be easily written in terms of dot and cross products as follows:

wherein

is the longitudinal component of p along n, given by the dot product,
 
is the transverse component of p with respect to n, and

is the cross product, of p with n.

The above formula shows that the longitudinal component of p remains unchanged, whereas the transverse portion of p is rotated in the plane perpendicular to n. This plane is spanned by the transverse portion of p itself and a direction perpendicular to both p and n. The rotation is directly identifiable in the equation as a 2D rotation over an angle η.

Passive rotations can be described by the same formula, but with an inverse sign of either η or n.

Conversion formulae between formalisms

Rotation matrix ↔ Euler angles
The Euler angles  can be extracted from the rotation matrix  by inspecting the rotation matrix in analytical form.

Rotation matrix → Euler angles ( extrinsic) 

Note that  is equivalent to  where it also takes into account the quadrant that the point  is in; see atan2.

When implementing the conversion, one has to take into account several situations:
 There are generally two solutions in the interval . The above formula works only when  is within the interval .
 There are infinitely many but countably many solutions outside of the interval .
 Whether all mathematical solutions apply for a given application depends on the situation.

Euler angles ( intrinsic) → rotation matrix 

The rotation matrix  is generated from the 3-2-1 intrinsic Euler angles by multiplying the three matrices generated by rotations about the axes. 

The axes of the rotation depend on the specific convention being used.

This yields

Note: This is valid for a right-hand system, which is the convention used in almost all engineering and physics disciplines.

The interpretation of these right-handed rotation matrices is that they express coordinate transformations (passive) as opposed to point transformations (active). Because  expresses a rotation from the local frame  to the global frame  (i.e.,  encodes the axes of frame  w.r.t frame ), the elementary rotation matrices are composed as above. Because the inverse rotation is just the rotation transposed, if we wanted the global-to-local rotation from frame  to frame , we would write .

Rotation matrix ↔ Euler axis/angle

Alternatively, the following method can be used:

The Euler axis is the eigenvector corresponding to the eigenvalue of 1, and  can be computed from the remaining eigenvalues.

The Euler axis can be also found using singular value decomposition since it is the normalized vector spanning the null-space of the matrix .

To convert the other way the rotation matrix corresponding to an Euler axis  and angle  can be computed according to Rodrigues' rotation formula (with appropriate modification) as follows:

with  the  identity matrix, and

is the cross-product matrix.

This expands to:

Rotation matrix ↔ quaternion
When computing a quaternion from the rotation matrix there is a sign ambiguity, since  and  represent the same rotation.

One way of computing the quaternion

from the rotation matrix  is as follows:

There are three other mathematically equivalent ways to compute . Numerical inaccuracy can be reduced by avoiding situations in which the denominator is close to zero. One of the other three methods looks as follows:

The rotation matrix corresponding to the quaternion  can be computed as follows:

where

which gives

or equivalently

Euler angles ↔ quaternion

Euler angles ( extrinsic) → quaternion 
We will consider the -convention 3-1-3 extrinsic Euler angles for the following algorithm. The terms of the algorithm depend on the convention used.

We can compute the quaternion

from the Euler angles  as follows:

Euler angles ( intrinsic) → quaternion 
A quaternion equivalent to yaw, pitch and roll angles. or intrinsic Tait–Bryan angles following the  convention, can be computed by

Quaternion → Euler angles ( extrinsic) 
Given the rotation quaternion

the -convention 3-1-3 extrinsic Euler Angles  can be computed by

Quaternion → Euler angles ( intrinsic) 
Given the rotation quaternion

yaw, pitch and roll angles, or intrinsic Tait–Bryan angles following the  convention, can be computed by

Euler axis–angle ↔ quaternion
Given the Euler axis  and angle , the quaternion

can be computed by

Given the rotation quaternion , define

Then the Euler axis  and angle  can be computed by

Rotation matrix ↔ Rodrigues vector

Rodrigues vector → Rotation matrix 

Since the definition of the Rodrigues vector can be related to rotation quaternions:By making use of the following propertyThe formula can be obtained by factoring  from the final expression obtained for quaternions:

Leading to the final formula:

Conversion formulae for derivatives

Rotation matrix ↔ angular velocities
The angular velocity vector

can be extracted from the time derivative of the rotation matrix  by the following relation:

The derivation is adapted from Ioffe as follows:

For any vector , consider  and differentiate it:

The derivative of a vector is the linear velocity of its tip. In this specific case, the relationship between the linear velocity vector and the angular velocity vector is 

(see circular motion and cross product).

By the transitivity of the abovementioned equations,  

which implies

Quaternion ↔ angular velocities
The angular velocity vector

can be obtained from the derivative of the quaternion  as follows:

Conversely, the derivative of the quaternion is

Rotors in a geometric algebra
The formalism of geometric algebra (GA) provides an extension and interpretation of the quaternion method. Central to GA is the geometric product of vectors, an extension of the traditional inner and cross products, given by

where the symbol  denotes the exterior product or wedge product. This product of vectors , and  produces two terms: a scalar part from the inner product and a bivector part from the wedge product. This bivector describes the plane perpendicular to what the cross product of the vectors would return.

Bivectors in GA have some unusual properties compared to vectors. Under the geometric product, bivectors have a negative square: the bivector  describes the -plane. Because the unit basis vectors are orthogonal to each other, the geometric product reduces to the antisymmetric outer product –  and  can be swapped freely at the cost of a factor of −1. The square reduces to  since the basis vectors themselves square to +1.

This result holds generally for all bivectors, and as a result the bivector plays a role similar to the imaginary unit. Geometric algebra uses bivectors in its analogue to the quaternion, the rotor, given by

where  is a unit bivector that describes the plane of rotation. Because  squares to −1, the power series expansion of  generates the trigonometric functions. The rotation formula that maps a vector  to a rotated vector  is then

where

Example.  A rotation about the axis

can be accomplished by converting  to its dual bivector,

where  is the unit volume element, the only trivector (pseudoscalar) in three-dimensional space. The result is

A rotation of the  vector in this plane by an angle  is then

Recognizing that

The terms are then computed:

The result of the rotation is then

A simple check on this result is the angle . Indeed, the rotation reduces to

exactly as expected. This rotation formula is valid not only for vectors but for any multivector. In addition, when Euler angles are used, the complexity of the operation is much reduced. Compounded rotations come from multiplying the rotors, so the total rotor from Euler angles is

but

These rotors come back out of the exponentials like so:

where  refers to rotation in the original coordinates. Similarly for the  rotation,

Noting that  and  commute (rotations in the same plane must commute), and the total rotor becomes

Thus, the compounded rotations of Euler angles become a series of equivalent rotations in the original fixed frame.

While rotors in geometric algebra work almost identically to quaternions in three dimensions, the power of this formalism is its generality:  this method is appropriate and valid in spaces with any number of dimensions. In 3D, rotations have three degrees of freedom, a degree for each linearly independent plane (bivector) the rotation can take place in. It has been known that pairs of quaternions can be used to generate rotations in 4D, yielding six degrees of freedom, and the geometric algebra approach verifies this result:  in 4D, there are six linearly independent bivectors that can be used as the generators of rotations.

Angle-Angle-Angle

Rotations can be modeled as an axis and an angle; as illustrated with a gyroscope which has an axis through the rotor, and the amount of spin around that axis demonstrated by the rotation of the rotor; this rotation can be expressed as  where axis is a unit vector specifying the direction of the rotor axis.  From the origin, in any direction, is the same rotation axis, with the scale of the angle equivalent to the distance from the origin.  From any other point in space, similarly the same direction vector applied relative to the orientation represented by the starting point rather than the origin applies the same change around the same axes that the unit vector specifies.  The  scaling each point gives a unique coordinate in Angle-Angle-Angle notation.  The difference between two coordinates immediately yields the single axis of rotation and angle between the two orientations.

The natural log of a quaternion represents curving space by 3 angles around 3 axles of rotation, and is expressed in arc-length; similar to Euler angles, but order independent.  There is a Lie product formula definition of the addition of rotations, which is that they are sum of infinitesimal steps of each rotation applied in series; this would imply that rotations are the result of all rotations in the same instant are applied, rather than a series of rotations applied subsequently.

The axes of rotation are aligned to the standard Cartesian  axes. These rotations may be simply added and subtracted, especially when the frames being rotated are fixed to each other as in IK chains.  Differences between two objects that are in the same reference frame are found by simply subtracting their orientations.  Rotations that are applied from external sources, or are from sources relative to the current rotation still require multiplications, application of the Rodriguez Formula is provided.

The rotation from each axle coordinate represent rotating the plane perpendicular to the specified axis simultaneously with all other axles.  Although the measures can be considered in angles, the representation is actually the arc-length of the curve; an angle implies a rotation around a point, where a curvature is a delta applied to the current point in an inertial direction.

Just an observational note: log quaternions have rings, or octaves of rotations; that is for rotations greater than 4 have related curves.  Curvatures of things that approach this boundary appear to chaotically jump orbits.

For 'human readable' angles the 1-norm can be used to rescale the angles to look more 'appropriate'; much like Celsius might be considered more correct than Fahrenheit.

Other related values are immediately derivable:

The total angle of rotation....

The axis of rotation...

Quaternion Representation

Basis Matrix Computation

This was built from rotating the vectors (1,0,0), (0,1,0), (0,0,1), and reducing constants.

Given an input ,

Which are used to compute the resulting matrix...

Alternate Basis Calculation

Alternatively this can be used

given: 

convert to angle-axis , and 

Compute some partial expressions:

Compute the resulting matrix: 

Expanded:

Vector Rotation

Rotate the vector  around the rotation vector .

The angle of rotation will be .

Calculate the cosine of the angle times the vector to rotate, plus sine of the angle times the axis of rotation, plus one minus cosine of the angle times the dot product of the vector and rotation axis times the axis of rotation.

Some notes: the dot product includes the cosine of the angle between the vector being rotated and the axis of rotation times the length of V; the cross product includes the sine of the angle between the vector being rotated and the axis of rotation.

Rotate a Rotation Vector

Using Rodrigues Composite Rotation Formula

For a given rotation vector , and another rotation vector  to rotate the frame around.

From the initial rotation vectors, extract the angles and axes:

Normalized axis of rotation for the current frame:

Normalized axis of rotation to rotate the frame around:

The result angle angle of the rotation is

or

The result, un-normalized axis of rotation:

or

The Rodrigues Rotation Formula would lead that the sin of above resulting angle can be used to normalize the vector, however this fails for large ranges; so normalize the result axis as any other vector.

And the final frame rotation coordinate:

Spin rotation around a fixed axis

A rotation vector  represents three axes; these may be used as a shorthand to rotate the rotation around using the above 'Rotate a Rotation Vector'.  These expressions are best represented as code fragments.

Setup some constants used in other expressions.

using the above values...

or

or

Conversion from Basis Matrix

Compute the determinant of the matrix...

Convert to the angle of rotation...

compute the normal factor...

the resulting angle-angle-angle:

Conversion from Normal Vector(Y)

Representation of a normal as a rotation, this assumes that the vector  is 'up'.  If some other axle is considered primary, the coordinates can be simply swapped.

This assume a normalized input vector in the direction of the normal

The angle is simply the sum of the x/z coordinate(or y,x if Z is 'up', or y,z if X is 'up')...

if angle is 0, the job is done, result with 

Some temporary values; these values are just partials referenced later...

Use the projected normal on the Y axis as the angle to rotate...

Align Normal using Basis
The default tangent and bi-tangent of rotations which only have their normal set, results in tangents and bi-tangents that are irregular.  Alternatively build a basis matrix, and convert from basis using the above mentioned method.
Compute the normal of the above, and the matrix to convert...

And then use the basis to log quaternion conversion...

Align Normal Directly

Or This is the direct computation to result with a log quaternion; compute the above result vector and then...

This is the angle

These partial products are used below...

Compute the normalized rotation vector (axle of rotation)...

and finally compute the resulting log quaternion.

Conversion from axis-angle

This assumes the input axis  is normalized.  If there is 0 rotation, result with

See also
Euler filter
Orientation (geometry)
Rotation around a fixed axis
Three-dimensional rotation operator

References

Further reading

External links

EuclideanSpace has a wealth of information on rotation representation
Q36. How do I generate a rotation matrix from Euler angles? and Q37. How do I convert a rotation matrix to Euler angles? — The Matrix and Quaternions FAQ
Imaginary numbers are not Real – the Geometric Algebra of Spacetime – Section "Rotations and Geometric Algebra" derives and applies the rotor description of rotations
Starlino's DCM Tutorial – Direction cosine matrix theory tutorial and applications. Space orientation estimation algorithm using  accelerometer, gyroscope and magnetometer IMU devices. Using complimentary filter (popular alternative to Kalman filter) with DCM matrix.

 
Rotation
Euclidean symmetries
Orientation (geometry)
Rigid bodies mechanics